Paris is the capital and most populous city of France, with an estimated population of 2,165,423 residents in 2019 in an area of more than 105 km² (41 sq mi), making it the fourth-most populated city in the European Union as well as the  30th most densely populated city in the world in 2022. Since the 17th century, Paris has been one of the world's major centres of finance, diplomacy, commerce, fashion, gastronomy, and science. For its leading role in the arts and sciences, as well as its very early system of street lighting, in the 19th century it became known as "the City of Light". Like London, prior to the Second World War, it was also sometimes called the capital of the world.

The City of Paris is the centre of the Île-de-France region, or Paris Region, with an estimated population of 12,262,544 in 2019, or about 19% of the population of France, making the region France's primate city. The Paris Region had a GDP of €739 billion ($743 billion) in 2019, the highest in Europe. According to the Economist Intelligence Unit Worldwide Cost of Living Survey, in 2022, Paris was the city with the ninth-highest cost of living in the world.

Paris is a major railway, highway, and air-transport hub served by two international airports: Charles de Gaulle Airport (the second-busiest airport in Europe) and Orly Airport. Opened in 1900, the city's subway system, the Paris Métro, serves 5.23 million passengers daily; it is the second-busiest metro system in Europe after the Moscow Metro. Gare du Nord is the 24th-busiest railway station in the world and the busiest outside Japan, with 262 million passengers in 2015. Paris is especially known for its museums and architectural landmarks: the Louvre received 2.8 million visitors in 2021, despite the long museum closings caused by the COVID-19 virus. The Musée d'Orsay, Musée Marmottan Monet and Musée de l'Orangerie are noted for their collections of French Impressionist art. The Pompidou Centre Musée National d'Art Moderne has the largest collection of modern and contemporary art in Europe and Musée Rodin and Musée Picasso. The historical district along the Seine in the city centre has been classified as a UNESCO World Heritage Site since 1991; popular landmarks there include the Cathedral of Notre Dame de Paris on the Île de la Cité, now closed for renovation after the 15 April 2019 fire. Other popular tourist sites include the Gothic royal chapel of Sainte-Chapelle, also on the Île de la Cité; the Eiffel Tower, constructed for the Paris Universal Exposition of 1889; the Grand Palais and Petit Palais, built for the Paris Universal Exposition of 1900; the Arc de Triomphe on the Champs-Élysées, and the hill of Montmartre with its artistic history and its Basilica of Sacré-Coeur.

Paris hosts several United Nations organisations including UNESCO, and other international organisations such as the OECD, the OECD Development Centre, the International Bureau of Weights and Measures, the International Energy Agency, the International Federation for Human Rights, along with European bodies such as the European Space Agency, the European Banking Authority or the European Securities and Markets Authority.

The football club Paris Saint-Germain and the rugby union club Stade Français are based in Paris. The 80,000-seat Stade de France, built for the 1998 FIFA World Cup, is located just north of Paris in the neighbouring commune of Saint-Denis. Paris hosts the annual French Open Grand Slam tennis tournament on the red clay of Roland Garros. The city hosted the Olympic Games in 1900, 1924 and will host the 2024 Summer Olympics. The 1938 and 1998 FIFA World Cups, the 2007 Rugby World Cup, as well as the 1960, 1984 and 2016 UEFA European Championships were also held in the city. Every July, the Tour de France bicycle race finishes on the Avenue des Champs-Élysées in Paris.

Etymology

The ancient oppidum that corresponds to the modern city of Paris was first mentioned in the mid-1st century BC by Julius Caesar as Luteciam Parisiorum ('Lutetia of the Parisii'), and is later attested as Parision in the 5th century AD, then as Paris in 1265.

The name Paris is derived from its early inhabitants, the Parisii (Gaulish: Parisioi), a Gallic tribe from the Iron Age and the Roman period. The meaning of the Gaulish ethnonym remains debated. According to Xavier Delamarre, it may derive from the Celtic root pario- ('cauldron'). Alfred Holder interpreted the name as 'the makers' or 'the commanders', by comparing it to the Welsh peryff ('lord, commander'), both possibly descending from a Proto-Celtic form reconstructed as *kwar-is-io-. Alternatively, Pierre-Yves Lambert proposed to translate Parisii as the 'spear people', by connecting the first element to the Old Irish carr ('spear'), derived from an earlier *kwar-sā. In any case, the city's name is not related to the Paris of Greek mythology.

Paris is often referred to as the 'City of Light' (La Ville Lumière), both because of its leading role during the Age of Enlightenment and more literally because Paris was one of the first large European cities to use gas street lighting on a grand scale on its boulevards and monuments. Gas lights were installed on the Place du Carrousel, Rue de Rivoli and Place Vendome in 1829. By 1857, the Grand boulevards were lit. By the 1860s, the boulevards and streets of Paris were illuminated by 56,000 gas lamps. Since the late 19th century, the city is sometimes called by the slang  term Panam(e), due to the Panama hats popularly worn in the capital in the early 20th century..

Inhabitants are known in English as "Parisians" and in French as Parisiens. They are also pejoratively called Parigots.

History

Origins

The Parisii, a sub-tribe of the Celtic Senones, inhabited the Paris area from around the middle of the 3rd century BC. One of the area's major north–south trade routes crossed the Seine on the île de la Cité; this meeting place of land and water trade routes gradually became an important trading centre. The Parisii traded with many river towns (some as far away as the Iberian Peninsula) and minted their own coins for that purpose.

The Romans conquered the Paris Basin in 52 BC and began their settlement on Paris's Left Bank. The Roman town was originally called Lutetia (more fully, Lutetia Parisiorum, "Lutetia of the Parisii", modern French Lutèce). It became a prosperous city with a forum, baths, temples, theatres, and an amphitheatre.

By the end of the Western Roman Empire, the town was known as Parisius, a Latin name that would later become Paris in French. Christianity was introduced in the middle of the 3rd century AD by Saint Denis, the first Bishop of Paris: according to legend, when he refused to renounce his faith before the Roman occupiers, he was beheaded on the hill which became known as Mons Martyrum (Latin "Hill of Martyrs"), later "Montmartre", from where he walked headless to the north of the city; the place where he fell and was buried became an important religious shrine, the Basilica of Saint-Denis, and many French kings are buried there.

Clovis the Frank, the first king of the Merovingian dynasty, made the city his capital from 508. As the Frankish domination of Gaul began, there was a gradual immigration by the Franks to Paris and the Parisian Francien dialects were born. Fortification of the Île de la Cité failed to avert sacking by Vikings in 845, but Paris's strategic importance—with its bridges preventing ships from passing—was established by successful defence in the Siege of Paris (885–886), for which the then Count of Paris (comte de Paris), Odo of France, was elected king of West Francia. From the Capetian dynasty that began with the 987 election of Hugh Capet, Count of Paris and Duke of the Franks (duc des Francs), as king of a unified West Francia, Paris gradually became the largest and most prosperous city in France.

High and Late Middle Ages to Louis XIV

By the end of the 12th century, Paris had become the political, economic, religious, and cultural capital of France. The Palais de la Cité, the royal residence, was located at the western end of the Île de la Cité. In 1163, during the reign of Louis VII, Maurice de Sully, bishop of Paris, undertook the construction of the Notre Dame Cathedral at its eastern extremity.

After the marshland between the river Seine and its slower 'dead arm' to its north was filled in from around the 10th century, Paris's cultural centre began to move to the Right Bank. In 1137, a new city marketplace (today's Les Halles) replaced the two smaller ones on the Île de la Cité and Place de Grève (Place de l'Hôtel de Ville). The latter location housed the headquarters of Paris's river trade corporation, an organisation that later became, unofficially (although formally in later years), Paris's first municipal government.

In the late 12th century, Philip Augustus extended the Louvre fortress to defend the city against river invasions from the west, gave the city its first walls between 1190 and 1215, rebuilt its bridges to either side of its central island, and paved its main thoroughfares. In 1190, he transformed Paris's former cathedral school into a student-teacher corporation that would become the University of Paris and would draw students from all of Europe.

With 200,000 inhabitants in 1328, Paris, then already the capital of France, was the most populous city of Europe. By comparison, London in 1300 had 80,000 inhabitants.

By the early fourteenth century so much filth had collected inside urban Europe that French and Italian cities were naming streets after human waste. There were rue Merdeux, rue Merdelet, rue Merdusson, rue des Merdons, and rue Merdiere—as well as a rue du Pipi.

During the Hundred Years' War, Paris was occupied by England-friendly Burgundian forces from 1418, before being occupied outright by the English when Henry V of England entered the French capital in 1420; in spite of a 1429 effort by Joan of Arc to liberate the city, it would remain under English occupation until 1436.

In the late 16th-century French Wars of Religion, Paris was a stronghold of the Catholic League, the organisers of 24 August 1572 St. Bartholomew's Day massacre in which thousands of French Protestants were killed. The conflicts ended when pretender to the throne Henry IV, after converting to Catholicism to gain entry to the capital, entered the city in 1594 to claim the crown of France. This king made several improvements to the capital during his reign: he completed the construction of Paris's first uncovered, sidewalk-lined bridge, the Pont Neuf, built a Louvre extension connecting it to the Tuileries Palace, and created the first Paris residential square, the Place Royale, now Place des Vosges. In spite of Henry IV's efforts to improve city circulation, the narrowness of Paris's streets was a contributing factor in his assassination near Les Halles marketplace in 1610.

During the 17th century, Cardinal Richelieu, chief minister of Louis XIII, was determined to make Paris the most beautiful city in Europe. He built five new bridges, a new chapel for the College of Sorbonne, and a palace for himself, the Palais-Cardinal, which he bequeathed to Louis XIII. After Richelieu's death in 1642, it was renamed the Palais-Royal.

Due to the Parisian uprisings during the Fronde civil war, Louis XIV moved his court to a new palace, Versailles, in 1682. Although no longer the capital of France, arts and sciences in the city flourished with the Comédie-Française, the Academy of Painting, and the French Academy of Sciences. To demonstrate that the city was safe from attack, the king had the city walls demolished and replaced with tree-lined boulevards that would become the Grands Boulevards of today. Other marks of his reign were the Collège des Quatre-Nations, the Place Vendôme, the Place des Victoires, and Les Invalides.

18th and 19th centuries

Paris grew in population from about 400,000 in 1640 to 650,000 in 1780. A new boulevard, the Champs-Élysées, extended the city west to Étoile, while the working-class neighbourhood of the Faubourg Saint-Antoine on the eastern site of the city grew more and more crowded with poor migrant workers from other regions of France.

Paris was the centre of an explosion of philosophic and scientific activity known as the Age of Enlightenment. Diderot and d'Alembert published their Encyclopédie in 1751, and the Montgolfier Brothers launched the first manned flight in a hot-air balloon on 21 November 1783, from the gardens of the Château de la Muette. Paris was the financial capital of continental Europe, the primary European centre of book publishing and fashion and the manufacture of fine furniture and luxury goods.

In the summer of 1789, Paris became the centre stage for the French Revolution. On 14 July, a mob seized the arsenal at the Invalides, acquiring thousands of guns, and stormed the Bastille, a symbol of royal authority. The first independent Paris Commune, or city council, met in the Hôtel de Ville and, on 15 July, elected a Mayor, the astronomer Jean Sylvain Bailly.

Louis XVI and the royal family were brought to Paris and made prisoners within the Tuileries Palace. In 1793, as the revolution turned more and more radical, the king, queen, and the mayor were guillotined (executed) in the Reign of Terror, along with more than 16,000 others throughout France. The property of the aristocracy and the church was nationalised, and the city's churches were closed, sold or demolished. A succession of revolutionary factions ruled Paris until 9 November 1799 (coup d'état du 18 brumaire), when Napoléon Bonaparte seized power as First Consul.

The population of Paris had dropped by 100,000 during the Revolution, but between 1799 and 1815, it surged with 160,000 new residents, reaching 660,000. Napoleon Bonaparte replaced the elected government of Paris with a prefect reporting only to him. He began erecting monuments to military glory, including the Arc de Triomphe, and improved the neglected infrastructure of the city with new fountains, the Canal de l'Ourcq, Père Lachaise Cemetery and the city's first metal bridge, the Pont des Arts.

During the Restoration, the bridges and squares of Paris were returned to their pre-Revolution names; the July Revolution in 1830 (commemorated by the July Column on the Place de la Bastille) brought a constitutional monarch, Louis Philippe I, to power. The first railway line to Paris opened in 1837, beginning a new period of massive migration from the provinces to the city. Louis-Philippe was overthrown by a popular uprising in the streets of Paris in 1848. His successor, Napoleon III, alongside the newly appointed prefect of the Seine, Georges-Eugène Haussmann, launched a gigantic public works project to build wide new boulevards, a new opera house, a central market, new aqueducts, sewers and parks, including the Bois de Boulogne and Bois de Vincennes. In 1860, Napoleon III also annexed the surrounding towns and created eight new arrondissements, expanding Paris to its current limits.

During the Franco-Prussian War (1870–1871), Paris was besieged by the Prussian Army. After months of blockade, hunger, and then bombardment by the Prussians, the city was forced to surrender on 28 January 1871. On 28 March, a revolutionary government called the Paris Commune seized power in Paris. The Commune held power for two months, until it was harshly suppressed by the French army during the "Bloody Week" at the end of May 1871.

Late in the 19th century, Paris hosted two major international expositions: the 1889 Universal Exposition, was held to mark the centennial of the French Revolution and featured the new Eiffel Tower; and the 1900 Universal Exposition, which gave Paris the Pont Alexandre III, the Grand Palais, the Petit Palais and the first Paris Métro line. Paris became the laboratory of Naturalism (Émile Zola) and Symbolism (Charles Baudelaire and Paul Verlaine), and of Impressionism in art (Courbet, Manet, Monet, Renoir).

20th and 21st centuries

By 1901, the population of Paris had grown to about 2,715,000. At the beginning of the century, artists from around the world including Pablo Picasso, Modigliani, and Henri Matisse made Paris their home. It was the birthplace of Fauvism, Cubism and abstract art, and authors such as Marcel Proust were exploring new approaches to literature.

During the First World War, Paris sometimes found itself on the front line; 600 to 1,000 Paris taxis played a small but highly important symbolic role in transporting 6,000 soldiers to the front line at the First Battle of the Marne. The city was also bombed by Zeppelins and shelled by German long-range guns. In the years after the war, known as Les Années Folles, Paris continued to be a mecca for writers, musicians and artists from around the world, including Ernest Hemingway, Igor Stravinsky, James Joyce, Josephine Baker, Eva Kotchever, Henry Miller, Anaïs Nin, Sidney Bechet and the surrealist Salvador Dalí.

In the years after the peace conference, the city was also home to growing numbers of students and activists from French colonies and other Asian and African countries, who later became leaders of their countries, such as Ho Chi Minh, Zhou Enlai and Léopold Sédar Senghor.

On 14 June 1940, the German army marched into Paris, which had been declared an "open city". On 16–17 July 1942, following German orders, the French police and gendarmes arrested 12,884 Jews, including 4,115 children, and confined them during five days at the Vel d'Hiv (Vélodrome d'Hiver), from which they were transported by train to the extermination camp at Auschwitz. None of the children came back. On 25 August 1944, the city was liberated by the French 2nd Armoured Division and the 4th Infantry Division of the United States Army. General Charles de Gaulle led a huge and emotional crowd down the Champs Élysées towards Notre Dame de Paris, and made a rousing speech from the Hôtel de Ville.

In the 1950s and the 1960s, Paris became one front of the Algerian War for independence; in August 1961, the pro-independence FLN targeted and killed 11 Paris policemen, leading to the imposition of a curfew on Muslims of Algeria (who, at that time, were French citizens). On 17 October 1961, an unauthorised but peaceful protest demonstration of Algerians against the curfew led to violent confrontations between the police and demonstrators, in which at least 40 people were killed, including some thrown into the Seine. The anti-independence Organisation armée secrète (OAS), for their part, carried out a series of bombings in Paris throughout 1961 and 1962.

In May 1968, protesting students occupied the Sorbonne and put up barricades in the Latin Quarter. Thousands of Parisian blue-collar workers joined the students, and the movement grew into a two-week general strike. Supporters of the government won the June elections by a large majority. The May 1968 events in France resulted in the break-up of the University of Paris into 13 independent campuses. In 1975, the National Assembly changed the status of Paris to that of other French cities and, on 25 March 1977, Jacques Chirac became the first elected mayor of Paris since 1793. It was highly controversial, and it remains the only building in the centre of the city over 32 storeys high. The population of Paris dropped from 2,850,000 in 1954 to 2,152,000 in 1990, as middle-class families moved to the suburbs. A suburban railway network, the RER (Réseau Express Régional), was built to complement the Métro; the Périphérique expressway encircling the city, was completed in 1973.

Most of the postwar presidents of the Fifth Republic wanted to leave their own monuments in Paris; President Georges Pompidou started the Centre Georges Pompidou (1977), Valéry Giscard d'Estaing began the Musée d'Orsay (1986); President François Mitterrand, in power for 14 years, had the Opéra Bastille built (1985–1989), the new site of the Bibliothèque nationale de France (1996), the Arche de la Défense (1985–1989) in La Défense, as well as the Louvre Pyramid with its underground courtyard (1983–1989); Jacques Chirac (2006), the Musée du quai Branly.

In the early 21st century, the population of Paris began to increase slowly again, as more young people moved into the city. It reached 2.25 million in 2011. In March 2001, Bertrand Delanoë became the first Socialist Mayor of Paris. In 2007, in an effort to reduce car traffic in the city, he introduced the Vélib', a system which rents bicycles for the use of local residents and visitors. Bertrand Delanoë also transformed a section of the highway along the Left Bank of the Seine into an urban promenade and park, the Promenade des Berges de la Seine, which he inaugurated in June 2013.

In 2007, President Nicolas Sarkozy launched the Grand Paris project, to integrate Paris more closely with the towns in the region around it. After many modifications, the new area, named the Metropolis of Grand Paris, with a population of 6.7 million, was created on 1 January 2016. In 2011, the City of Paris and the national government approved the plans for the Grand Paris Express, totalling  of automated metro lines to connect Paris, the innermost three departments around Paris, airports and high-speed rail (TGV) stations, at an estimated cost of €35 billion. The system is scheduled to be completed by 2030.

In January 2015, Al-Qaeda in the Arabian Peninsula claimed attacks across the Paris region. 1.5 million people marched in Paris in a show of solidarity against terrorism and in support of freedom of speech. In November of the same year, terrorist attacks, claimed by ISIL, killed 130 people and injured more than 350.

Geography

Location

Paris is located in northern central France, in a north-bending arc of the river Seine whose crest includes two islands, the Île Saint-Louis and the larger Île de la Cité, which form the oldest part of the city. The city is spread widely on both banks of the river.

The city's last major annexation of outlying territories in 1860 not only gave it its modern form but also created the 20 clockwise-spiralling arrondissements (municipal boroughs).

Climate

Paris has a typical Western European oceanic climate (Köppen: Cfb), which is affected by the North Atlantic Current. The overall climate throughout the year is mild and moderately wet. Each year, however, there are a few days when the temperature rises above . Longer periods of more intense heat sometimes occur, such as the heat wave of 2003 when temperatures exceeded  for weeks, reached  on some days and rarely cooled down at night. Spring and autumn have, on average, mild days and fresh nights but are changing and unstable. Surprisingly warm or cool weather occurs frequently in both seasons. Light night frosts are however quite common, but the temperature seldom dips below . Snow falls every year, but rarely stays on the ground. The city sometimes sees light snow or flurries with or without accumulation.

However, the city is known for intermittent, abrupt, heavy showers.

Administration

City government

For almost all of its long history, except for a few brief periods, Paris was governed directly by representatives of the king, emperor, or president of France. The city was not granted municipal autonomy by the National Assembly until 1974. For all but 14 months from 1794 to 1977, Paris was the only French commune without a mayor, and thus had less autonomy than the smallest village. For most of the time from 1800 to 1977 (except briefly in 1848 and 1870–71), it was directly controlled by the departmental prefect (the prefect of the Seine until 1968, and the prefect of Paris from 1968 to 1977).

The first modern elected mayor of Paris was Jacques Chirac, elected 20 March 1977, becoming the city's first mayor since 1871 and only the fourth since 1794. The current mayor is Anne Hidalgo, a socialist, first elected 5 April 2014 and re-elected 28 June 2020.

The mayor of Paris is elected indirectly by Paris voters; the voters of each of the city's 20 arrondissements elect members to the Conseil de Paris (Council of Paris), which subsequently elects the mayor. The council is composed of 163 members, with each arrondissement allocated a number of seats dependent upon its population, from 10 members for each of the least-populated arrondissements (1st through 9th) to 34 members for the most populated (the 15th). The council is elected using closed list proportional representation in a two-round system. Party lists winning an absolute majority in the first round – or at least a plurality in the second round – automatically win half the seats of an arrondissement. The remaining half of seats are distributed proportionally to all lists which win at least 5% of the vote using the highest averages method. This ensures that the winning party or coalition always wins a majority of the seats, even if they do not win an absolute majority of the vote.

Once elected, the council plays a largely passive role in the city government, primarily because it meets only once a month. The council is divided between a coalition of the left of 91 members, including the socialists, communists, greens, and extreme left; and 71 members for the centre-right, plus a few members from smaller parties.

Each of Paris's 20 arrondissements has its own town hall and a directly elected council, which, in turn, elects an arrondissement mayor. The council of each arrondissement is composed of members of the Conseil de Paris and also members who serve only on the council of the arrondissement. The number of deputy mayors in each arrondissement varies depending upon its population. There are a total of 20 arrondissement mayors and 120 deputy mayors.

The budget of the city for 2018 is 9.5 billion Euros, with an expected deficit of 5.5 billion Euros. 7.9 billion Euros are designated for city administration, and 1.7 billion Euros for investment. The number of city employees increased from 40,000 in 2001 to 55,000 in 2018. The largest part of the investment budget is earmarked for public housing (262 million Euros) and for real estate (142 million Euros).

Métropole du Grand Paris

The Métropole du Grand Paris, or simply Grand Paris, formally came into existence on 1 January 2016. It is an administrative structure for co-operation between the City of Paris and its nearest suburbs. It includes the City of Paris, plus the communes of the three departments of the inner suburbs (Hauts-de-Seine, Seine-Saint-Denis and Val-de-Marne), plus seven communes in the outer suburbs, including Argenteuil in Val d'Oise and Paray-Vieille-Poste in Essonne, which were added to include the major airports of Paris.

The new structure is administered by a Metropolitan Council of 210 members, not directly elected, but chosen by the councils of the member Communes. By 2020 its basic competencies will include urban planning, housing and protection of the environment. The first president of the metropolitan council, Patrick Ollier, a Republican and the mayor of the town of Rueil-Malmaison, was elected on 22 January 2016. Though the Metropole has a population of nearly seven million people and accounts for 25 percent of the GDP of France, it has a very small budget: just 65 million Euros, compared with eight billion Euros for the City of Paris.

Regional government
The Region of Île de France, including Paris and its surrounding communities, is governed by the Regional Council, which has its headquarters in the 7th arrondissement of Paris. It is composed of 209 members representing the different communes within the region. On 15 December 2015, a list of candidates of the Union of the Right, a coalition of centrist and right-wing parties, led by Valérie Pécresse, narrowly won the regional election, defeating a coalition of Socialists and ecologists. The Socialists had governed the region for seventeen years. The regional council has 121 members from the Union of the Right, 66 from the Union of the Left and 22 from the extreme right National Front.

National government

As the capital of France, Paris is the seat of France's national government. For the executive, the two chief officers each have their own official residences, which also serve as their offices. The President of the French Republic resides at the Élysée Palace in the 8th arrondissement, while the Prime Minister's seat is at the Hôtel Matignon in the 7th arrondissement. Government ministries are located in various parts of the city; many are located in the 7th arrondissement, near the Hôtel Matignon.

Both houses of the French Parliament are located on the Rive Gauche. The upper house, the Senate, meets in the Palais du Luxembourg in the 6th arrondissement, while the more important lower house, the National Assembly, meets in the Palais Bourbon in the 7th arrondissement. The President of the Senate, the second-highest public official in France (the President of the Republic being the sole superior), resides in the Petit Luxembourg, a smaller palace annexe to the Palais du Luxembourg.

France's highest courts are located in Paris. The Court of Cassation, the highest court in the judicial order, which reviews criminal and civil cases, is located in the Palais de Justice on the Île de la Cité, while the Conseil d'État, which provides legal advice to the executive and acts as the highest court in the administrative order, judging litigation against public bodies, is located in the Palais-Royal in the 1st arrondissement. The Constitutional Council, an advisory body with ultimate authority on the constitutionality of laws and government decrees, also meets in the Montpensier wing of the Palais Royal.

Paris and its region host the headquarters of several international organisations including UNESCO, the Organisation for Economic Co-operation and Development, the International Chamber of Commerce, the Paris Club, the European Space Agency, the International Energy Agency, the Organisation internationale de la Francophonie, the European Union Institute for Security Studies, the International Bureau of Weights and Measures, the International Exhibition Bureau, and the International Federation for Human Rights.

Following the motto "Only Paris is worthy of Rome; only Rome is worthy of Paris"; the only sister city of Paris is Rome, although Paris has partnership agreements with many other cities around the world.

Police force

The security of Paris is mainly the responsibility of the Prefecture of Police of Paris, a subdivision of the Ministry of the Interior. It supervises the units of the National Police who patrol the city and the three neighbouring departments. It is also responsible for providing emergency services, including the Paris Fire Brigade. Its headquarters is on Place Louis Lépine on the Île de la Cité.

There are 43 800 officers under the prefecture, and a fleet of more than 6,000 vehicles, including police cars, motorcycles, fire trucks, boats and helicopters. The national police has its own special unit for riot control and crowd control and security of public buildings, called the Compagnies Républicaines de Sécurité (CRS), a unit formed in 1944 right after the liberation of France. Vans of CRS agents are frequently seen in the centre of the city when there are demonstrations and public events.

The police are supported by the National Gendarmerie, a branch of the French Armed Forces, though their police operations now are supervised by the Ministry of the Interior. The traditional kepis of the gendarmes were replaced in 2002 with caps, and the force modernised, though they still wear kepis for ceremonial occasions.

Crime in Paris is similar to that in most large cities. Violent crime is relatively rare in the city centre. Political violence is uncommon, though very large demonstrations may occur in Paris and other French cities simultaneously. These demonstrations, usually managed by a strong police presence, can turn confrontational and escalate into violence.

Cityscape

Urbanism and architecture

Paris is one of the few world capitals that has rarely seen destruction by catastrophe or war. For this, even its earliest history is still visible in its streetmap, and centuries of rulers adding their respective architectural marks on the capital has resulted in an accumulated wealth of history-rich monuments and buildings whose beauty played a large part in giving the city the reputation it has today. At its origin, before the Middle Ages, the city was composed of several islands and sandbanks in a bend of the Seine; of those, two remain today: Île Saint-Louis and the Île de la Cité. A third one is the 1827 artificially created Île aux Cygnes.

Modern Paris owes much of its downtown plan and architectural harmony to Napoleon III and his Prefect of the Seine, Baron Haussmann. Between 1853 and 1870 they rebuilt the city centre, created the wide downtown boulevards and squares where the boulevards intersected, imposed standard facades along the boulevards, and required that the facades be built of the distinctive cream-grey "Paris stone". They also built the major parks around the city centre. The high residential population of its city centre also makes it much different from most other western major cities.

Paris's urbanism laws have been under strict control since the early 17th century, particularly where street-front alignment, building height and building distribution is concerned. The  Tour Montparnasse was both Paris's and France's tallest building since 1973, but this record has been held by the La Défense quarter Tour First tower in Courbevoie since its 2011 construction.

Parisian examples of historical architectural styles date back more than a millennium, including the Romanesque church of the Abbey of Saint-Germain-des-Prés (1014–1163), the early Gothic Architecture of the Basilica of Saint-Denis (1144), the Notre Dame Cathedral (1163–1345), the Flamboyant Gothic of Saint Chapelle (1239–1248), the Baroque churches of Saint-Paul-Saint-Louis (1627–1641) and Les Invalides (1670–1708). The 19th century produced the neoclassical church of La Madeleine (1808–1842), the Palais Garnier serving as an opera house (1875), the neo-Byzantine Basilica of Sacré-Cœur (1875–1919), as well as the exuberant Belle Époque modernism of the Eiffel Tower (1889). Striking examples of 20th-century architecture include the Centre Georges Pompidou by Richard Rogers and Renzo Piano (1977), the Cité des Sciences et de l'Industrie by various architects (1986), the Arab World Institute by Jean Nouvel (1987), the Louvre Pyramid by I. M. Pei (1989) and the Opéra Bastille by Carlos Ott (1989). Contemporary architecture includes the Musée du quai Branly – Jacques Chirac by Jean Nouvel (2006), the contemporary art museum of the Louis Vuitton Foundation by Frank Gehry (2014) and the new Tribunal de grande instance de Paris by Renzo Piano (2018).

Housing
The most expensive residential streets in Paris in 2018 by average price per square metre were Avenue Montaigne (8th arrondissement), at 22,372 euros per square metre; Place Dauphine (1st arrondissement; 20,373 euros) and the Rue de Furstemberg (6th arrondissement) at 18,839 euros per square metre. Among these,  (85.9 percent) were main residences,  (6.8 percent) were secondary residences, and the remaining 7.3 percent were empty (down from 9.2 percent in 2006).

Sixty-two percent of its buildings date from 1949 and before, 20 percent were built between 1949 and 1974, and only 18 percent of the buildings remaining were built after that date. Two-thirds of the city's 1.3 million residences are studio and two-room apartments. Paris averages 1.9 people per residence, a number that has remained constant since the 1980s, but it is much less than Île-de-France's 2.33 person-per-residence average. Only 33 percent of principal residence Parisians own their habitation (against 47 percent for the entire Île-de-France): the major part of the city's population is a rent-paying one. Social or public housing represented 19.9 percent of the city's total residences in 2017. Its distribution varies widely throughout the city, from 2.6 percent of the housing in the wealthy 7th arrondissement, to 24 percent in the 20th arrondissement, 26 percent in the 14th arrondissement and 39.9 percent in the 19th arrondissement, on the poorer southwest and northern edges of the city.

On the night of 8–9 February 2019, during a period of cold weather, a Paris NGO conducted its annual citywide count of homeless persons. They counted 3,641 homeless persons in Paris, of whom twelve percent were women. More than half had been homeless for more than a year. 2,885 were living in the streets or parks, 298 in train and metro stations, and 756 in other forms of temporary shelter. This was an increase of 588 persons since 2018.

Paris and its suburbs

Aside from the 20th-century addition of the Bois de Boulogne, the Bois de Vincennes and the Paris heliport, Paris's administrative limits have remained unchanged since 1860. A greater administrative Seine department had been governing Paris and its suburbs since its creation in 1790, but the rising suburban population had made it difficult to maintain as a unique entity. To address this problem, the parent "District de la région parisienne" ('district of the Paris region') was reorganised into several new departments from 1968: Paris became a department in itself, and the administration of its suburbs was divided between the three new departments surrounding it. The district of the Paris region was renamed "Île-de-France" in 1977, but this abbreviated "Paris region" name is still commonly used today to describe the Île-de-France, and as a vague reference to the entire Paris agglomeration. Long-intended measures to unite Paris with its suburbs began on 1 January 2016, when the Métropole du Grand Paris came into existence.

Paris's disconnect with its suburbs, its lack of suburban transportation, in particular, became all too apparent with the Paris agglomeration's growth. Paul Delouvrier promised to resolve the Paris-suburbs mésentente when he became head of the Paris region in 1961: two of his most ambitious projects for the Region were the construction of five suburban "villes nouvelles" ("new cities") and the RER commuter train network. Many other suburban residential districts (grands ensembles) were built between the 1960s and 1970s to provide a low-cost solution for a rapidly expanding population: These districts were socially mixed at first, but few residents actually owned their homes (the growing economy made these accessible to the middle classes only from the 1970s). Their poor construction quality and their haphazard insertion into existing urban growth contributed to their desertion by those able to move elsewhere and their repopulation by those with more limited possibilities.

These areas, quartiers sensibles ("sensitive quarters"), are in northern and eastern Paris, namely around its Goutte d'Or and Belleville neighbourhoods. To the north of the city, they are grouped mainly in the Seine-Saint-Denis department, and to a lesser extreme to the east in the Val-d'Oise department. Other difficult areas are located in the Seine valley, in Évry et Corbeil-Essonnes (Essonne), in Mureaux, Mantes-la-Jolie (Yvelines), and scattered among social housing districts created by Delouvrier's 1961 "ville nouvelle" political initiative.

The Paris agglomeration's urban sociology is basically that of 19th-century Paris: the wealthy live in the west and southwest, and the middle-to-working classes are in the north and east. The remaining areas are mostly middle-class dotted with wealthy islands located there due to reasons of historical importance, namely Saint-Maur-des-Fossés to the east and Enghien-les-Bains to the north of Paris.

Demographics

The official estimated population of the City of Paris was 2,165,423 on 1 January 2022, according to the INSEE, the official French statistical agency. This was a decline of 11,000 from January 2021, and a drop of 65,000 over six years. Despite the drop, Paris remains the most densely-populated city in Europe, with 252 residents per hectare, not counting parks. This drop was attributed partly to a lower birth rate, the departure of middle-class residents and the possible loss of housing in the city due to short-term rentals for tourism.

Paris is the fourth largest municipality in the European Union, following Berlin, Madrid and Rome. Eurostat places Paris (6.5 million people) behind London (8 million) and ahead of Berlin (3.5 million), based on the 2012 populations of what Eurostat calls "urban audit core cities".

The population of Paris today is lower than its historical peak of 2.9 million in 1921. The principal reasons were a significant decline in household size, and a dramatic migration of residents to the suburbs between 1962 and 1975. Factors in the migration included de-industrialisation, high rent, the gentrification of many inner quarters, the transformation of living space into offices, and greater affluence among working families. The city's population loss came to a temporary halt at the beginning of the 21st century; the population increased from 2,125,246 in 1999 to 2,240,621 in 2012, before declining again slightly in 2017, 2018, and again in 2021.

Paris is the core of a built-up area that extends well beyond its limits: commonly referred to as the agglomération Parisienne, and statistically as a unité urbaine (a measure of urban area), the Paris agglomeration's population of 10,785,092 in 2017 made it the largest urban area in the European Union. City-influenced commuter activity reaches well beyond even this in a statistical aire d'attraction de Paris ("functional area", a statistical method comparable to a metropolitan area), that had a population of 13,024,518 in 2017, 19.6% of the population of France, and the largest metropolitan area in the Eurozone.

According to Eurostat, the EU statistical agency, in 2012 the Commune of Paris was the most densely populated city in the European Union, with 21,616 people per square kilometre within the city limits (the NUTS-3 statistical area), ahead of Inner London West, which had 10,374 people per square kilometre. According to the same census, three departments bordering Paris, Hauts-de-Seine, Seine-Saint-Denis and Val-de-Marne, had population densities of over 10,000 people per square kilometre, ranking among the 10 most densely populated areas of the EU.

Migration
According to the 2012 French census, 586,163 residents of the City of Paris, or 26.2 percent, and 2,782,834 residents of the Paris Region (Île-de-France), or 23.4 percent, were born outside of metropolitan France (the last figure up from 22.4% at the 2007 census). 26,700 of these in the City of Paris and 210,159 in the Paris Region were people born in Overseas France (more than two-thirds of whom in the French West Indies) and are therefore not counted as immigrants since they were legally French citizens at birth.

A further 103,648 in the City of Paris and in 412,114 in the Paris Region were born in foreign countries with French citizenship at birth. This concerns in particular the many Christians and Jews from North Africa who moved to France and Paris after the times of independence and are not counted as immigrants due to their being born French citizens. The remaining group, people born in foreign countries with no French citizenship at birth, are those defined as immigrants under French law. According to the 2012 census, 135,853 residents of the City of Paris were immigrants from Europe, 112,369 were immigrants from the Maghreb, 70,852 from sub-Saharan Africa and Egypt, 5,059 from Turkey, 91,297 from Asia (outside Turkey), 38,858 from the Americas, and 1,365 from the South Pacific. Note that the immigrants from the Americas and the South Pacific in Paris are vastly outnumbered by migrants from French overseas regions and territories located in these regions of the world.

In the Paris Region, 590,504 residents were immigrants from Europe, 627,078 were immigrants from the Maghreb, 435,339 from sub-Saharan Africa and Egypt, 69,338 from Turkey, 322,330 from Asia (outside Turkey), 113,363 from the Americas, and 2,261 from the South Pacific. These last two groups of immigrants are again vastly outnumbered by migrants from French overseas regions and territories located in the Americas and the South Pacific.

In 2012, there were 8,810 British citizens and 10,019 United States citizens living in the City of Paris (Ville de Paris) and 20,466 British citizens and 16,408 United States citizens living in the entire Paris Region (Île-de-France).

Religion

At the beginning of the twentieth century, Paris was the largest Catholic city in the world. French census data does not contain information about religious affiliation. According to a 2011 survey by the Institut français d'opinion publique (IFOP), a French public opinion research organisation, 61 percent of residents of the Paris Region (Île-de-France) identified themselves as Roman Catholic. In the same survey, 7 percent of residents identified themselves as Muslims, 4 percent as Protestants, 2 percent as Jewish and 25 percent as without religion.

According to the INSEE, between 4 and 5 million French residents were born or had at least one parent born in a predominantly Muslim country, particularly Algeria, Morocco and Tunisia. An IFOP survey in 2008 reported that, of immigrants from these predominantly Muslim countries, 25 percent went to the mosque regularly; 41 percent practised the religion, and 34 percent were believers but did not practice the religion. In 2012 and 2013, it was estimated that there were almost 500,000 Muslims in the City of Paris, 1.5 million Muslims in the Île-de-France region and 4 to 5 million Muslims in France.

The Jewish population of the Paris Region was estimated in 2014 to be 282,000, the largest concentration of Jews in the world outside of Israel and the United States.

International organisations
The United Nations Educational, Scientific and Cultural Organization (UNESCO) has had its headquarters in Paris since November 1958. Paris is also the home of the Organisation for Economic Co-operation and Development (OECD). Paris hosts the headquarters of the European Space Agency, the International Energy Agency, European Securities and Markets Authority and, since 2019, the European Banking Authority.

Economy

The economy of the City of Paris is based largely on services and commerce; of the 390,480 enterprises in the city, 80.6 percent are engaged in commerce, transportation, and diverse services, 6.5 percent in construction, and just 3.8 percent in industry. The story is similar in the Paris Region (Île-de-France): 76.7 percent of enterprises are engaged in commerce and services, and 3.4 percent in industry.

At the 2012 census, 59.5% of jobs in the Paris Region were in market services (12.0% in wholesale and retail trade, 9.7% in professional, scientific, and technical services, 6.5% in information and communication, 6.5% in transportation and warehousing, 5.9% in finance and insurance, 5.8% in administrative and support services, 4.6% in accommodation and food services, and 8.5% in various other market services), 26.9% in non-market services (10.4% in human health and social work activities, 9.6% in public administration and defence, and 6.9% in education), 8.2% in manufacturing and utilities (6.6% in manufacturing and 1.5% in utilities), 5.2% in construction, and 0.2% in agriculture.

The Paris Region had 5.4 million salaried employees in 2010, of whom 2.2 million were concentrated in 39 pôles d'emplois or business districts. The largest of these, in terms of number of employees, is known in French as the QCA, or quartier central des affaires; it is in the western part of the City of Paris, in the 2nd, 8th, 9th, 16th, and 18th arrondissements. In 2010, it was the workplace of 500,000 salaried employees, about 30 percent of the salaried employees in Paris and 10 percent of those in the Île-de-France. The largest sectors of activity in the central business district were finance and insurance (16 percent of employees in the district) and business services (15 percent). The district also includes a large concentration of department stores, shopping areas, hotels and restaurants, as well a government offices and ministries.

The second-largest business district in terms of employment is La Défense, just west of the city, where many companies installed their offices in the 1990s. In 2010, it was the workplace of 144,600 employees, of whom 38 percent worked in finance and insurance, 16 percent in business support services. Two other important districts, Neuilly-sur-Seine and Levallois-Perret, are extensions of the Paris business district and of La Défense. Another district, including Boulogne-Billancourt, Issy-les-Moulineaux and the southern part of the 15th arrondissement, is a centre of activity for the media and information technology.

The top French companies listed in the Fortune Global 500 for 2021 all have their headquarters in the Paris Region; six in the central business district of the City of Paris; and four close to the city in the Hauts-de-Seine Department, three in La Défense and one in Boulogne-Billancourt. Some companies, like Société Générale, have offices in both Paris and La Défense.

The Paris Region is France's leading region for economic activity, with a GDP of €742 billion and €59,400 per capita. or around 1/3 of the economy of France in 2019. In 2019, its GDP ranked first among the regions of Europe and its per-capita GDP PPP was the 7th highest in Europe.  While the Paris region's population accounted for 18.8 percent of metropolitan France in 2011, the Paris region's GDP accounted for 30 percent of metropolitan France's GDP.

The Paris Region economy has gradually shifted from industry to high-value-added service industries (finance, IT services) and high-tech manufacturing (electronics, optics, aerospace, etc.). The Paris region's most intense economic activity through the central Hauts-de-Seine department and suburban La Défense business district places Paris's economic centre to the west of the city, in a triangle between the Opéra Garnier, La Défense and the Val de Seine. While the Paris economy is dominated by services, and employment in manufacturing sector has declined sharply, the region remains an important manufacturing centre, particularly for aeronautics, automobiles, and "eco" industries.

In the 2017 worldwide cost of living survey by the Economist Intelligence Unit, based on a survey made in September 2016, Paris ranked as the seventh most expensive city in the world, and the second most expensive in Europe, after Zurich.

In 2018, Paris was the most expensive city in the world with Singapore and Hong Kong.

Station F is a business incubator for startups, located in 13th arrondissement of Paris. Noted as the world's largest startup facility.

Employment

According to 2015 INSEE figures, 68.3 percent of employees in the City of Paris work in commerce, transportation, and services; 24.5 percent in public administration, health and social services; 4.1 percent in industry, and 0.1 percent in agriculture.

The majority of Paris's salaried employees fill 370,000 businesses services jobs, concentrated in the north-western 8th, 16th and 17th arrondissements. Paris's financial service companies are concentrated in the central-western 8th and 9th arrondissement banking and insurance district. Paris's department store district in the 1st, 6th, 8th and 9th arrondissements employ ten percent of mostly female Paris workers, with 100,000 of these registered in the retail trade. Fourteen percent of Parisians work in hotels and restaurants and other services to individuals. Nineteen percent of Paris employees work for the State in either administration or education. The majority of Paris's healthcare and social workers work at the hospitals and social housing concentrated in the peripheral 13th, 14th, 18th, 19th and 20th arrondissements. Outside Paris, the western Hauts-de-Seine department La Défense district specialising in finance, insurance and scientific research district, employs 144,600, and the north-eastern Seine-Saint-Denis audiovisual sector has 200 media firms and 10 major film studios.

Paris's manufacturing is mostly focused in its suburbs, and the city itself has only around 75,000 manufacturing workers, most of which are in the textile, clothing, leather goods, and shoe trades. Paris region manufacturing specialises in transportation, mainly automobiles, aircraft and trains, but this is in a sharp decline: Paris proper manufacturing jobs dropped by 64 percent between 1990 and 2010, and the Paris region lost 48 percent during the same period. Most of this is due to companies relocating outside the Paris region. The Paris region's 800 aerospace companies employed 100,000. Four hundred automobile industry companies employ another 100,000 workers: many of these are centred in the Yvelines department around the Renault and PSA-Citroën plants (this department alone employs 33,000), but the industry as a whole suffered a major loss with the 2014 closing of a major Aulnay-sous-Bois Citroën assembly plant.

The southern Essonne department specialises in science and technology, and the south-eastern Val-de-Marne, with its wholesale Rungis food market, specialises in food processing and beverages. The Paris region's manufacturing decline is quickly being replaced by eco-industries: these employ about 100,000 workers. In 2011, while only 56,927 construction workers worked in Paris itself, its metropolitan area employed 246,639, in an activity centred largely on the Seine-Saint-Denis (41,378) and Hauts-de-Seine (37,303) departments and the new business-park centres appearing there.

Unemployment
The unemployment rate in Paris in the 4th trimester of 2021 was six percent, compared with 7.2 percent in the whole Ile-de-France, and 7.4 percent in the whole of France. This was the lowest rate in thirteen years.

Incomes

The average net household income (after social, pension and health insurance contributions) in Paris was €36,085 for 2011. It ranged from €22,095 in the 19th arrondissement to €82,449 in the 7th arrondissement. The median taxable income for 2011 was around €25,000 in Paris and €22,200 for Île-de-France. Generally speaking, incomes are higher in the Western part of the city and in the western suburbs than in the northern and eastern parts of the urban area.

While Paris has some of the richest neighbourhoods in France, it also has some of the poorest, mostly on the eastern side of the city. In 2012, 14 percent of households in the city earned less than €977 per month, the official poverty line. Twenty-five percent of residents in the 19th arrondissement lived below the poverty line; 24 percent in the 18th, 22 percent in the 20th and 18 percent in the 10th. In the city's wealthiest neighbourhood, the 7th arrondissement, 7 percent lived below the poverty line; 8 percent in the 6th arrondissement; and 9 percent in the 16th arrondissement.

Tourism

Tourism recovered in the Paris region in 2021, increasing to 22.6 million visitors, thirty percent more than in 2020, but still well below 2019 levels. The number of visitors from the United States increased by 237 percent over 2020.

Greater Paris, comprising Paris and its three surrounding departments, received 38 million visitors in 2019, a record, measured by hotel arrivals. These included 12.2 million French visitors. Of foreign visitors, the greatest number came from the United States (2.6 million), United Kingdom (1.2 million), Germany (981 thousand) and China (711 thousand). However, tourism to Paris and its region fell to 17.5 million in 2020 due to the COVID-19 pandemic, with a 78 percent drop in foreign tourists measured by hotel stays, and a drop of 56 percent in French guests, for an overall drop of 68 percent. This caused a drop 15 billion Euros in hotel receipts.

In 2018, measured by the Euromonitor Global Cities Destination Index, Paris was the second-busiest airline destination in the world, with 19.10 million visitors, behind Bangkok (22.78 million) but ahead of London (19.09 million). According to the Paris Convention and Visitors Bureau, 393,008 workers in Greater Paris, or 12.4% of the total workforce, are engaged in tourism-related sectors such as hotels, catering, transport and leisure.

Monuments and attractions

The city's top cultural attraction in 2019 was the Basilica of Sacré-Cœur (11 million visitors), followed by the Louvre (9.6 million visitors); the Eiffel Tower (6.1 million visitors); the Centre Pompidou (3.5 million visitors); and the Musée d'Orsay (3.3 million visitors).

The centre of Paris contains the most visited monuments in the city, including the Notre Dame Cathedral (now closed for restoration) and the Louvre as well as the Sainte-Chapelle; Les Invalides, where the tomb of Napoleon is located, and the Eiffel Tower are located on the Left Bank south-west of the centre. The Panthéon and the Catacombs of Paris are also located on the Left Bank of the Seine. The banks of the Seine from the Pont de Sully west to the Pont d'Iéna have been listed as a UNESCO World Heritage Site since 1991.

Other landmarks are laid out east to west along the historical axis of Paris, which runs from the Louvre through the Tuileries Garden, the Luxor Column in the Place de la Concorde, and the Arc de Triomphe, to the Grande Arche of La Défense. Several other much-visited landmarks are located in the suburbs of the city; the Basilica of St Denis, in Seine-Saint-Denis, is the birthplace of the Gothic style of architecture and the royal necropolis of French kings and queens. The Paris region hosts three other UNESCO Heritage sites: the Palace of Versailles in the west, the Palace of Fontainebleau in the south, and the medieval fairs site of Provins in the east.

Hotels
In 2019, Greater Paris had 2,056 hotels, including 94 five-star hotels, with a total of 121,646 rooms. Paris has long been famous for its grand hotels. The Hotel Meurice, opened for British travellers in 1817, was one of the first luxury hotels in Paris. The arrival of the railways and the Paris Exposition of 1855 brought the first flood of tourists and the first modern grand hotels; the Hôtel du Louvre (now an antiques marketplace) in 1855; the Grand Hotel (now the InterContinental Paris Le Grand Hotel) in 1862; and the Hôtel Continental in 1878. The Hôtel Ritz on Place Vendôme opened in 1898, followed by the Hôtel Crillon in an 18th-century building on the Place de la Concorde in 1909; the Hotel Bristol on the Rue du Faubourg Saint-Honoré in 1925; and the Hotel George V in 1928.

In addition to hotels, in 2019 Greater Paris had 60,000 homes registered with Airbnb. Under French law, renters of these units must pay the Paris tourism tax. The company paid the city government 7.3 million euros in 2016.

Culture

Painting and sculpture

For centuries, Paris has attracted artists from around the world, who arrive in the city to educate themselves and to seek inspiration from its vast pool of artistic resources and galleries. As a result, Paris has acquired a reputation as the "City of Art". Italian artists were a profound influence on the development of art in Paris in the 16th and 17th centuries, particularly in sculpture and reliefs. Painting and sculpture became the pride of the French monarchy and the French royal family commissioned many Parisian artists to adorn their palaces during the French Baroque and Classicism era. Sculptors such as Girardon, Coysevox and Coustou acquired reputations as the finest artists in the royal court in 17th-century France. Pierre Mignard became the first painter to King Louis XIV during this period. In 1648, the Académie royale de peinture et de sculpture (Royal Academy of Painting and Sculpture) was established to accommodate for the dramatic interest in art in the capital. This served as France's top art school until 1793.

Paris was in its artistic prime in the 19th century and early 20th century, when it had a colony of artists established in the city and in art schools associated with some of the finest painters of the times: Henri de Toulouse-Lautrec, Édouard Manet, Claude Monet, Berthe Morisot, Paul Gauguin, Pierre-Auguste Renoir and others. The French Revolution and political and social change in France had a profound influence on art in the capital. Paris was central to the development of Romanticism in art, with painters such as Géricault. Impressionism, Art Nouveau, Symbolism, Fauvism, Cubism and Art Deco movements all evolved in Paris. In the late 19th century, many artists in the French provinces and worldwide flocked to Paris to exhibit their works in the numerous salons and expositions and make a name for themselves. Artists such as Pablo Picasso, Henri Matisse, Vincent van Gogh, Paul Cézanne, Jean Metzinger, Albert Gleizes, Henri Rousseau, Marc Chagall, Amedeo Modigliani and many others became associated with Paris. Picasso, living in Le Bateau-Lavoir in Montmartre, painted his famous La Famille de Saltimbanques and Les Demoiselles d'Avignon between 1905 and 1907. Montmartre and Montparnasse became centres for artistic production.

The most prestigious names of French and foreign sculptors, who made their reputation in Paris in the modern era, are Frédéric Auguste Bartholdi (Statue of Liberty – Liberty Enlightening the World), Auguste Rodin, Camille Claudel, Antoine Bourdelle, Paul Landowski (statue of Christ the Redeemer in Rio de Janeiro) and Aristide Maillol. The Golden Age of the School of Paris ended between the two world wars.

Photography
The inventor Nicéphore Niépce produced the first permanent photograph on a polished pewter plate in Paris in 1825. In 1839, after the death of Niépce, Louis Daguerre patented the Daguerrotype, which became the most common form of photography until the 1860s. The work of Étienne-Jules Marey in the 1880s contributed considerably to the development of modern photography. Photography came to occupy a central role in Parisian Surrealist activity, in the works of Man Ray and Maurice Tabard. Numerous photographers achieved renown for their photography of Paris, including Eugène Atget, noted for his depictions of street scenes, Robert Doisneau, noted for his playful pictures of people and market scenes (among which Le baiser de l'hôtel de ville has become iconic of the romantic vision of Paris), Marcel Bovis, noted for his night scenes, as well as others such as Jacques-Henri Lartigue and Henri Cartier-Bresson. Poster art also became an important art form in Paris in the late nineteenth century, through the work of Henri de Toulouse-Lautrec, Jules Chéret, Eugène Grasset, Adolphe Willette, Pierre Bonnard, Georges de Feure, Henri-Gabriel Ibels, Paul Gavarni and Alphonse Mucha.

Museums

Paris Museums were closed for much of 2020, but gradually re-opened in 2021, with limitations on the number of visitors at a time and a requirement that visitors wear masks and show proof of vaccination.

The Louvre received 2,8 million visitors in 2021, up from 2.7 million in 2020. holding its position as first among the most-visited museums. Its treasures include the Mona Lisa (La Joconde), the Venus de Milo statue, and Liberty Leading the People. The second-most visited museum in the city in 2021, with 1.5 million visitors, was the Centre Georges Pompidou, also known as Beaubourg, which houses the Musée National d'Art Moderne The third most visited Paris museum in 2021 was the National Museum of Natural History with 1,4 million visitors. It is famous for its dinosaur artefacts, mineral collections and its Gallery of Evolution. It was followed by the Musée d'Orsay, featuring 19th century art and the French Impressionists, which had one million visitors. Paris hosts one of the largest science museums in Europe, the Cité des sciences et de l'industrie, (984,000 visitors in 2020). The other most-visited Paris museums in 2021 were the Fondation Louis Vuitton (691,000), the Musée du Quai Branly – Jacques Chirac, featuring the indigenous art and cultures of Africa, Asia, Oceania, and the Americas. (616,000); the Musée Carnavalet (History of Paris) (606,000), and the Petit Palais, the art museum of the City of Paris (518,000).

The Musée de l'Orangerie, near both the Louvre and the Orsay, also exhibits Impressionists and Post-Impressionists, including most of Claude Monet's large Water Lilies murals. The Musée national du Moyen Âge, or Cluny Museum, presents Medieval art, including the famous tapestry cycle of The Lady and the Unicorn. The Guimet Museum, or Musée national des arts asiatiques, has one of the largest collections of Asian art in Europe. There are also notable museums devoted to individual artists, including the Musée Picasso, the Musée Rodin and the Musée national Eugène Delacroix.

The military history of France, from the Middle Ages to World War II, is vividly presented by displays at the Musée de l'Armée at Les Invalides, near the tomb of Napoleon. In addition to the national museums, run by the Ministry of Culture, the City of Paris operates 14 museums, including the Carnavalet Museum on the history of Paris, Musée d'Art Moderne de la Ville de Paris, Palais de Tokyo, the House of Victor Hugo, the House of Balzac and the Catacombs of Paris. There are also notable private museums; The Contemporary Art museum of the Louis Vuitton Foundation, designed by architect Frank Gehry, opened in October 2014 in the Bois de Boulogne.

Theatre
The largest opera houses of Paris are the 19th-century Opéra Garnier (historical Paris Opéra) and modern Opéra Bastille; the former tends toward the more classic ballets and operas, and the latter provides a mixed repertoire of classic and modern. In the middle of the 19th century, there were three other active and competing opera houses: the Opéra-Comique (which still exists), Théâtre-Italien and Théâtre Lyrique (which in modern times changed its profile and name to Théâtre de la Ville). Philharmonie de Paris, the modern symphonic concert hall of Paris, opened in January 2015. Another musical landmark is the Théâtre des Champs-Élysées, where the first performances of Diaghilev's Ballets Russes took place in 1913.

Theatre traditionally has occupied a large place in Parisian culture, and many of its most popular actors today are also stars of French television. The oldest and most famous Paris theatre is the Comédie-Française, founded in 1680. Run by the Government of France, it performs mostly French classics at the Salle Richelieu in the Palais-Royal at 2 rue de Richelieu, just north of the Louvre. Other famous theatres include the Odéon-Théâtre de l'Europe, just north of the Luxembourg Gardens, also a state institution and theatrical landmark; the Théâtre Mogador, and the Théâtre de la Gaîté-Montparnasse.

The music hall and cabaret are famous Paris institutions. The Moulin Rouge was opened in 1889. It was highly visible because of its large red imitation windmill on its roof, and became the birthplace of the dance known as the French Cancan. It helped make famous the singers Mistinguett and Édith Piaf and the painter Toulouse-Lautrec, who made posters for the venue. In 1911, the dance hall Olympia Paris invented the grand staircase as a settling for its shows, competing with its great rival, the Folies Bergère. Its stars in the 1920s included the American singer and dancer Josephine Baker. Later, Olympia Paris presented Dalida, Edith Piaf, Marlene Dietrich, Miles Davis, Judy Garland and the Grateful Dead.

The Casino de Paris presented many famous French singers, including Mistinguett, Maurice Chevalier and Tino Rossi. Other famous Paris music halls include Le Lido, on the Champs-Élysées, opened in 1946; and the Crazy Horse Saloon, featuring strip-tease, dance and magic, opened in 1951. A half dozen music halls exist today in Paris, attended mostly by visitors to the city.

Literature

The first book printed in France, Epistolae ("Letters"), by Gasparinus de Bergamo (Gasparino da Barzizza), was published in Paris in 1470 by the press established by Johann Heynlin. Since then, Paris has been the centre of the French publishing industry, the home of some of the world's best-known writers and poets, and the setting for many classic works of French literature. Almost all the books published in Paris in the Middle Ages were in Latin, rather than French. Paris did not become the acknowledged capital of French literature until the 17th century, with authors such as Boileau, Corneille, La Fontaine, Molière, Racine, Charles Perrault, several coming from the provinces, as well as the foundation of the Académie française. In the 18th century, the literary life of Paris revolved around the cafés and salons; it was dominated by Voltaire, Jean-Jacques Rousseau, Pierre de Marivaux and Pierre Beaumarchais.

During the 19th century, Paris was the home and subject for some of France's greatest writers, including Charles Baudelaire, Stéphane Mallarmé, Mérimée, Alfred de Musset, Marcel Proust, Émile Zola, Alexandre Dumas, Gustave Flaubert, Guy de Maupassant and Honoré de Balzac. Victor Hugo's The Hunchback of Notre Dame inspired the renovation of its setting, the Notre-Dame de Paris. Another of Victor Hugo's works, Les Misérables, written while he was in exile outside France during the Second Empire, described the social change and political turmoil in Paris in the early 1830s. One of the most popular of all French writers, Jules Verne, worked at the Theatre Lyrique and the Paris stock exchange, while he did research for his stories at the National Library.

In the 20th century, the Paris literary community was dominated by figures such as Colette, André Gide, François Mauriac, André Malraux, Albert Camus, and, after World War II, by Simone de Beauvoir and Jean-Paul Sartre. Between the wars it was the home of many important expatriate writers, including Ernest Hemingway, Samuel Beckett, Miguel Ángel Asturias, Alejo Carpentier and, Arturo Uslar Pietri. The winner of the 2014 Nobel Prize in Literature, Patrick Modiano (who lives in Paris), based most of his literary work on the depiction of the city during World War II and the 1960s–1970s.

Paris is a city of books and bookstores. In the 1970s, 80 percent of French-language publishing houses were found in Paris, almost all on the Left Bank in the 5th, 6th and 7th arrondissements. Since that time, because of high prices, some publishers have moved out to the less expensive areas. It is also a city of small bookstores. There are about 150 bookstores in the 5th arrondissement alone, plus another 250 book stalls along the Seine. Small Paris bookstores are protected against competition from discount booksellers by French law; books, even e-books, cannot be discounted more than five percent below their publisher's cover price.

Music

In the late 12th century, a school of polyphony was established at Notre-Dame. Among the Trouvères of northern France, a group of Parisian aristocrats became known for their poetry and songs. Troubadours, from the south of France, were also popular. During the reign of François I, in the Renaissance era, the lute became popular in the French court. The French royal family and courtiers "disported themselves in masques, ballets, allegorical dances, recitals, and opera and comedy", and a national musical printing house was established. In the Baroque-era, noted composers included Jean-Baptiste Lully, Jean-Philippe Rameau, and François Couperin. The Conservatoire de Musique de Paris was founded in 1795. By 1870, Paris had become an important centre for symphony, ballet and operatic music.

Romantic-era composers (in Paris) include Hector Berlioz (La Symphonie fantastique), Charles Gounod (Faust), Camille Saint-Saëns (Samson et Delilah), Léo Delibes (Lakmé) and Jules Massenet (Thaïs), among others. Georges Bizet's Carmen premiered 3 March 1875. Carmen has since become one of the most popular and frequently-performed operas in the classical canon. Among the Impressionist composers who created new works for piano, orchestra, opera, chamber music and other musical forms, stand in particular, Claude Debussy (Suite bergamasque, and its well-known third movement, Clair de lune, La Mer, Pelléas et Mélisande), Erik Satie (Gymnopédies, "Je te veux", Gnossiennes, Parade) and Maurice Ravel (Miroirs, Boléro, La valse, L'heure espagnole). Several foreign-born composers, such as Frédéric Chopin (Poland), Franz Liszt (Hungary), Jacques Offenbach (Germany), Niccolò Paganini (Italy), and Igor Stravinsky (Russia), established themselves or made significant contributions both with their works and their influence in Paris.

Bal-musette is a style of French music and dance that first became popular in Paris in the 1870s and 1880s; by 1880 Paris had some 150 dance halls in the working-class neighbourhoods of the city. Patrons danced the bourrée to the accompaniment of the cabrette (a bellows-blown bagpipe locally called a "musette") and often the vielle à roue (hurdy-gurdy) in the cafés and bars of the city. Parisian and Italian musicians who played the accordion adopted the style and established themselves in Auvergnat bars especially in the 19th arrondissement, and the romantic sounds of the accordion has since become one of the musical icons of the city. Paris became a major centre for jazz and still attracts jazz musicians from all around the world to its clubs and cafés.

Paris is the spiritual home of gypsy jazz in particular, and many of the Parisian jazzmen who developed in the first half of the 20th century began by playing Bal-musette in the city. Django Reinhardt rose to fame in Paris, having moved to the 18th arrondissement in a caravan as a young boy, and performed with violinist Stéphane Grappelli and their Quintette du Hot Club de France in the 1930s and 1940s.

Immediately after the War the Saint-Germain-des-Pres quarter and the nearby Saint-Michel quarter became home to many small jazz clubs, mostly found in cellars because of a lack of space; these included the Caveau des Lorientais, the Club Saint-Germain, the Rose Rouge, the Vieux-Colombier, and the most famous, Le Tabou. They introduced Parisians to the music of Claude Luter, Boris Vian, Sydney Bechet, Mezz Mezzrow, and Henri Salvador. Most of the clubs closed by the early 1960s, as musical tastes shifted toward rock and roll.

Some of the finest manouche musicians in the world are found here playing the cafés of the city at night. Some of the more notable jazz venues include the New Morning, Le Sunset, La Chope des Puces and Bouquet du Nord. Several yearly festivals take place in Paris, including the Paris Jazz Festival and the rock festival Rock en Seine. The Orchestre de Paris was established in 1967. On 19 December 2015, Paris and other worldwide fans commemorated the 100th anniversary of the birth of Edith Piaf—a cabaret singer-songwriter and actress who became widely regarded as France's national chanteuse, as well as being one of France's greatest international stars. Other singers—of similar style—include Maurice Chevalier, Charles Aznavour, Yves Montand, as well as Charles Trenet.

Paris has a big hip hop scene. This music became popular during the 1980s. The presence of a large African and Caribbean community helped to its development, it gave a voice, a political and social status for many minorities.

Cinema

The movie industry was born in Paris when Auguste and Louis Lumière projected the first motion picture for a paying audience at the Grand Café on 28 December 1895. Many of Paris's concert/dance halls were transformed into cinemas when the media became popular beginning in the 1930s. Later, most of the largest cinemas were divided into multiple, smaller rooms. Paris's largest cinema room today is in the Grand Rex theatre with 2,700 seats.Big multiplex cinemas have been built since the 1990s. UGC Ciné Cité Les Halles with 27 screens, MK2 Bibliothèque with 20 screens and UGC Ciné Cité Bercy with 18 screens are among the largest.

Parisians tend to share the same movie-going trends as many of the world's global cities, with cinemas primarily dominated by Hollywood-generated film entertainment. French cinema comes a close second, with major directors (réalisateurs) such as Claude Lelouch, Jean-Luc Godard, and Luc Besson, and the more slapstick/popular genre with director Claude Zidi as an example. European and Asian films are also widely shown and appreciated. On 2 February 2000, Philippe Binant realised the first digital cinema projection in Europe, with the DLP CINEMA technology developed by Texas Instruments, in Paris.

Restaurants and cuisine

Since the late 18th century, Paris has been famous for its restaurants and haute cuisine, food meticulously prepared and artfully presented. A luxury restaurant, La Taverne Anglaise, opened in 1786 in the arcades of the Palais-Royal by Antoine Beauvilliers; it featured an elegant dining room, an extensive menu, linen tablecloths, a large wine list and well-trained waiters; it became a model for future Paris restaurants. The restaurant Le Grand Véfour in the Palais-Royal dates from the same period. The famous Paris restaurants of the 19th century, including the Café de Paris, the Rocher de Cancale, the Café Anglais, Maison Dorée and the Café Riche, were mostly located near the theatres on the Boulevard des Italiens; they were immortalised in the novels of Balzac and Émile Zola. Several of the best-known restaurants in Paris today appeared during the Belle Époque, including Maxim's on Rue Royale, Ledoyen in the gardens of the Champs-Élysées, and the Tour d'Argent on the Quai de la Tournelle.

Today, due to Paris's cosmopolitan population, every French regional cuisine and almost every national cuisine in the world can be found there; the city has more than 9,000 restaurants. The Michelin Guide has been a standard guide to French restaurants since 1900, awarding its highest award, three stars, to the best restaurants in France. In 2018, of the 27 Michelin three-star restaurants in France, ten are located in Paris. These include both restaurants which serve classical French cuisine, such as L'Ambroisie in the Place des Vosges, and those which serve non-traditional menus, such as L'Astrance, which combines French and Asian cuisines. Several of France's most famous chefs, including Pierre Gagnaire, Alain Ducasse, Yannick Alléno and Alain Passard, have three-star restaurants in Paris.

In addition to the classical restaurants, Paris has several other kinds of traditional eating places. The café arrived in Paris in the 17th century, when the beverage was first brought from Turkey, and by the 18th century Parisian cafés were centres of the city's political and cultural life. The Café Procope on the Left Bank dates from this period. In the 20th century, the cafés of the Left Bank, especially Café de la Rotonde and Le Dôme Café in Montparnasse and Café de Flore and Les Deux Magots on Boulevard Saint Germain, all still in business, were important meeting places for painters, writers and philosophers. A bistro is a type of eating place loosely defined as a neighbourhood restaurant with a modest decor and prices and a regular clientele and a congenial atmosphere. Its name is said to have come in 1814 from the Russian soldiers who occupied the city; "bistro" means "quickly" in Russian, and they wanted their meals served rapidly so they could get back to their encampment. Real bistros are increasingly rare in Paris, due to rising costs, competition from cheaper ethnic restaurants, and different eating habits of Parisian diners. A brasserie originally was a tavern located next to a brewery, which served beer and food at any hour. Beginning with the Paris Exposition of 1867; it became a popular kind of restaurant which featured beer and other beverages served by young women in the national costume associated with the beverage, particularly German costumes for beer. Now brasseries, like cafés, serve food and drinks throughout the day.

Fashion

Since the 19th century, Paris has been an international fashion capital, particularly in the domain of haute couture (clothing hand-made to order for private clients). It is home to some of the largest fashion houses in the world, including Dior and Chanel, as well as many other well-known and more contemporary fashion designers, such as Karl Lagerfeld, Jean-Paul Gaultier, Yves Saint Laurent, Givenchy, and Christian Lacroix. Paris Fashion Week, held in January and July in the Carrousel du Louvre among other renowned city locations, is one of the top four events on the international fashion calendar. The other fashion capitals of the world, Milan, London, and New York, also host fashion weeks. Moreover, Paris is also the home of the world's largest cosmetics company: L'Oréal as well as three of the top five global makers of luxury fashion accessories: Louis Vuitton, Hermés, and Cartier. Most of the major fashion designers have their showrooms along the Avenue Montaigne, between the Champs-Élysées and the Seine.

Holidays and festivals

Bastille Day, a celebration of the storming of the Bastille in 1789, the biggest festival in the city, is a military parade taking place every year on 14 July on the Champs-Élysées, from the Arc de Triomphe to Place de la Concorde. It includes a flypast over the Champs Élysées by the Patrouille de France, a parade of military units and equipment, and a display of fireworks in the evening, the most spectacular being the one at the Eiffel Tower.

Some other yearly festivals are Paris-Plages, a festive event that lasts from mid-July to mid-August when the Right Bank of the Seine is converted into a temporary beach with sand, deck chairs and palm trees; Journées du Patrimoine, Fête de la Musique, Techno Parade, Nuit Blanche, Cinéma au clair de lune, Printemps des rues, Festival d'automne, and Fête des jardins. The Carnaval de Paris, one of the oldest festivals in Paris, dates back to the Middle Ages.

Education

Paris is the département with the highest proportion of highly educated people. In 2009, around 40 percent of Parisians held a licence-level diploma or higher, the highest proportion in France, while 13 percent have no diploma, the third-lowest percentage in France. Education in Paris and the Île-de-France region employs approximately 330,000 people, 170,000 of whom are teachers and professors teaching approximately 2.9 million children and students in around 9,000 primary, secondary, and higher education schools and institutions.

The University of Paris, founded in the 12th century, is often called the Sorbonne after one of its original medieval colleges. It was broken up into thirteen autonomous universities in 1970, following the student demonstrations in 1968. Most of the campuses today are in the Latin Quarter where the old university was located, while others are scattered around the city and the suburbs.
The Paris region hosts France's highest concentration of the grandes écoles – 55 specialised centres of higher-education outside or inside the public university structure. The prestigious public universities are usually considered grands établissements. Most of the grandes écoles were relocated to the suburbs of Paris in the 1960s and 1970s, in new campuses much larger than the old campuses within the crowded City of Paris, though the École Normale Supérieure, PSL University has remained on rue d'Ulm in the 5th arrondissement. There are a high number of engineering schools, led by the PSL University (which comprises several colleges such as École des Mines, École nationale supérieure de chimie, École Pratique des Hautes Études and Paris-Dauphine), the Paris-Saclay University (which comprises several colleges such as AgroParisTech, CentraleSupélec and ENS Paris-Saclay) the Polytechnic Institute of Paris (which comprises several colleges such as École Polytechnique, Télécom Paris and École nationale de la statistique et de l'administration économique) and also independent colleges such as École des Ponts et Chaussées or Arts et Métiers. There are also many business schools, including HEC, INSEAD, ESSEC, and ESCP Europe. While ENA, the school training higher-level civil servants, has been relocated from Paris to Strasbourg, three of the most prestigious social sciences universities, Sciences Po (7th arrondissement), École des hautes études en sciences sociales (6th arrondissement), and Paris-Dauphine (16th arrondissement) are still located in Paris. The Parisian school of journalism CELSA department of Sorbonne University is located in Neuilly-sur-Seine. Paris is also home to several of France's most famous high-schools such as Lycée Louis-le-Grand, Lycée Henri-IV, Lycée Janson de Sailly and Lycée Condorcet. The National Institute of Sport and Physical Education, located in the 12th arrondissement, is both a physical education institute and high-level training centre for elite athletes.

Libraries

The Bibliothèque nationale de France (BnF) operates public libraries in Paris, among them the François Mitterrand Library, Richelieu Library, Louvois, Opéra Library, and Arsenal Library. There are three public libraries in the 4th arrondissement. The Forney Library, in the Marais district, is dedicated to the decorative arts; the Arsenal Library occupies a former military building, and has a large collection on French literature; and the Bibliothèque historique de la ville de Paris, also in Le Marais, contains the Paris historical research service. The Sainte-Geneviève Library is in 5th arrondissement; designed by Henri Labrouste and built in the mid-1800s, it contains a rare book and manuscript division. Bibliothèque Mazarine, in the 6th arrondissement, is the oldest public library in France. The Médiathèque Musicale Mahler in the 8th arrondissement opened in 1986 and contains collections related to music. The François Mitterrand Library (nicknamed Très Grande Bibliothèque) in the 13th arrondissement was completed in 1994 to a design of Dominique Perrault and contains four glass towers.

There are several academic libraries and archives in Paris. The Sorbonne Library in the 5th arrondissement is the largest university library in Paris. In addition to the Sorbonne location, there are branches in Malesherbes, Clignancourt-Championnet, Michelet-Institut d'Art et d'Archéologie, Serpente-Maison de la Recherche, and Institut des Etudes Ibériques. Other academic libraries include Interuniversity Pharmaceutical Library, Leonardo da Vinci University Library, Paris School of Mines Library, and the René Descartes University Library.

Sports

Paris's most popular sport clubs are the association football club Paris Saint-Germain F.C. and the rugby union clubs Stade Français and Racing 92, the last of which is based just outside the city proper. The 80,000-seat Stade de France, built for the 1998 FIFA World Cup, is located just north of Paris in the commune of Saint-Denis. It is used for football, rugby union and track and field athletics. It hosts the France national football team for friendlies and major tournaments qualifiers, annually hosts the French national rugby team's home matches of the Six Nations Championship, and hosts several important matches of the Stade Français rugby team. In addition to Paris Saint-Germain F.C., the city has a number of other professional and amateur football clubs: Paris FC, Red Star, RCF Paris and Stade Français Paris.

Paris hosted the 1900 and 1924 Summer Olympics and will host the 2024 Summer Olympics and Paralympic Games.

The city also hosted the finals of the 1938 FIFA World Cup (at the Stade Olympique de Colombes), as well as the 1998 FIFA World Cup and the 2007 Rugby World Cup Final (both at the Stade de France). Three UEFA Champions League Finals in the current century have also been played in the Stade de France: the 2000, 2006 and 2022. Paris has most recently been the host for UEFA Euro 2016, both at the Parc des Princes in the city proper and also at Stade de France, with the latter hosting the opening match and final.

The final stage of the most famous bicycle racing in the world, Tour de France, always finishes in Paris. Since 1975, the race has finished on the Champs-Elysées.

Tennis is another popular sport in Paris and throughout France; the French Open, held every year on the red clay of the Roland Garros National Tennis Centre, is one of the four Grand Slam events of the world professional tennis tour. The 17,000-seat Bercy Arena (officially named AccorHotels Arena and formerly known as the Palais Omnisports de Paris-Bercy) is the venue for the annual Paris Masters ATP Tour tennis tournament and has been a frequent site of national and international tournaments in basketball, boxing, cycling, handball, ice hockey, show jumping and other sports. The Bercy Arena also hosted the 2017 IIHF World Ice Hockey Championship, together with Cologne, Germany. The final stages of the FIBA EuroBasket 1951 and EuroBasket 1999 were also played in Paris, the latter at the Palais Omnisports de Paris-Bercy.

The basketball team Levallois Metropolitans plays some of its games at the 4,000 capacity Stade Pierre de Coubertin. Another top-level professional team, Nanterre 92, plays in Nanterre.

In 2023, a professional American football team, the Paris Saints, were formed in the city joining the European league of football.

Infrastructure

Transport

Paris is a major rail, highway, and air transport hub. Île-de-France Mobilités (IDFM), formerly the Syndicat des transports d'Île-de-France (STIF) and before that the Syndicat des transports parisiens (STP), oversees the transit network in the region. The syndicate coordinates public transport and contracts it out to the RATP (operating 347 bus lines, the Métro, eight tramway lines, and sections of the RER), the SNCF (operating suburban rails, one tramway line and the other sections of the RER) and the Optile consortium of private operators managing 1,176 bus lines.

According to a 2018 INSEE survey, a large majority of Parisians (64.3 percent) use public transport to get to work. Only 10.6 percent commuted to work by automobile. 10.5 percent walked or used roller skates; 5.5 percent commuted by bicycle; and 4.4 percent commuted by motorbike.

Bike lanes are being doubled, while electric car incentives are being created. The French capital is banning the most polluting automobiles from key districts.

Railways

A central hub of the national rail network, Paris's six major railway stations (Gare du Nord, Gare de l'Est, Gare de Lyon, Gare d'Austerlitz, Gare Montparnasse, Gare Saint-Lazare) and a minor one (Gare de Bercy) are connected to three networks: the TGV serving four high-speed rail lines, the normal speed Corail trains, and the suburban rails (Transilien).

Métro, RER and tramway

Over €26.5 billion will be invested over the next 15 years to extend the Métro network into the suburbs, with notably the Grand Paris Express project.

In addition, the Paris region is served by a light rail network of nine lines, the tramway: Line T1 runs from Asnières-Gennevilliers to Noisy-le-Sec, Line T2 runs from Pont de Bezons to Porte de Versailles, Line T3a runs from Pont du Garigliano to Porte de Vincennes, Line T3b runs from Porte de Vincennes to Porte d'Asnières, Line T5 runs from Saint-Denis to Garges-Sarcelles, Line T6 runs from Châtillon to Viroflay, Line T7 runs from Villejuif to Athis-Mons, Line T8 runs from Saint-Denis to Épinay-sur-Seine and Villetaneuse, all of which are operated by the RATP Group, and line T4 runs from Bondy RER to Aulnay-sous-Bois, which is operated by the state rail carrier SNCF. Five new light rail lines are currently in various stages of development.

Air

Paris is a major international air transport hub with the 5th busiest airport system in the world. The city is served by three commercial international airports: Charles de Gaulle Airport, Orly Airport and Beauvais–Tillé Airport. Together these three airports recorded traffic of 112 million passengers in 2019. There is also one general aviation airport, Paris–Le Bourget Airport, historically the oldest Parisian airport and closest to the city centre, which is now used only for private business flights and air shows.

Orly Airport, located in the southern suburbs of Paris, replaced Le Bourget as the principal airport of Paris from the 1950s to the 1980s. Charles de Gaulle Airport, located on the edge of the northern suburbs of Paris, opened to commercial traffic in 1974 and became the busiest Parisian airport in 1993. For the year 2017 it was the 5th busiest airport in the world by international traffic and it is the hub for the nation's flag carrier Air France.

Domestically, air travel between Paris and some of France's largest cities such as Lyon, Marseille, or Strasbourg has been in a large measure replaced by high-speed rail due to the opening of several high-speed TGV rail lines from the 1980s. For example, after the LGV Méditerranée opened in 2001, air traffic between Paris and Marseille declined from 2,976,793 passengers in 2000 to 1,502,196 passengers in 2014. After the LGV Est opened in 2007, air traffic between Paris and Strasbourg declined from 1,006,327 passengers in 2006 to 157,207 passengers in 2014.

Internationally, air traffic has increased markedly in recent years between Paris and the Gulf airports, the emerging nations of Africa, Russia, Turkey, Portugal, Italy, and mainland China, whereas noticeable decline has been recorded between Paris and the British Isles, Egypt, Tunisia, and Japan.

Motorways

The city is also the most important hub of France's motorway network, and is surrounded by three orbital freeways: the Périphérique, which follows the approximate path of 19th-century fortifications around Paris, the A86 motorway in the inner suburbs, and finally the Francilienne motorway in the outer suburbs.

Waterways
The Paris region is the most active water transport area in France, with most of the cargo handled by Ports of Paris in facilities located around Paris. The rivers Loire, Rhine, Rhône, Meuse, and Scheldt can be reached by canals connecting with the Seine, which include the Canal Saint-Martin, Canal Saint-Denis, and the Canal de l'Ourcq.

Cycling

These include piste cyclable (bike lanes separated from other traffic by physical barriers such as a kerb) and bande cyclable (a bicycle lane denoted by a painted path on the road). Some  of specially marked bus lanes are free to be used by cyclists, with a protective barrier protecting against encroachments from vehicles. Cyclists have also been given the right to ride in both directions on certain one-way streets. Paris offers a bike sharing system called Vélib' with more than 20,000 public bicycles distributed at 1,800 parking stations, which can be rented for short and medium distances including one way trips.

Electricity
Electricity is provided to Paris through a peripheral grid fed by multiple sources. In 2012, around 50% of electricity generated in the Île-de-France came from cogeneration energy plants located near the outer limits of the region; other energy sources included thermal power (35%), waste incineration (9% – with cogeneration plants, these provide the city in heat as well), methane gas (5%), hydraulics (1%), solar power (0.1%) and a negligible amount of wind power (0.034 GWh). A quarter of the city's district heating is to come from a plant in Saint-Ouen-sur-Seine, burning a 50/50-mix of coal and 140,000 tonnes of wood pellets from the United States per year.

Water and sanitation

Paris in its early history had only the rivers Seine and Bièvre for water. From 1809, the Canal de l'Ourcq provided Paris with water from less-polluted rivers to the north-east of the capital. From 1857, the civil engineer Eugène Belgrand, under Napoleon III, oversaw the construction of a series of new aqueducts that brought water from locations all around the city to several reservoirs built atop the Capital's highest points of elevation. From then on, the new reservoir system became Paris's principal source of drinking water, and the remains of the old system, pumped into lower levels of the same reservoirs, were from then on used for the cleaning of Paris's streets. This system is still a major part of Paris's modern water-supply network.

In 1982, Mayor Chirac introduced the motorcycle-mounted Motocrotte to remove dog faeces from Paris streets. The project was abandoned in 2002 for a new and better enforced local law, under the terms of which dog owners can be fined up to €500 for not removing their dog faeces. The air pollution in Paris, from the point of view of particulate matter (PM10), is the highest in France with 38 μg/m3. From the point of view of nitrogen dioxide pollution, Paris has one of the highest levels in the EU.

Parks and gardens

Paris today has more than 421 municipal parks and gardens, covering more than 3,000 hectares and containing more than 250,000 trees. Two of Paris's oldest and most famous gardens are the Tuileries Garden (created in 1564 for the Tuileries Palace and redone by André Le Nôtre between 1664 and 1672) and the Luxembourg Garden, for the Luxembourg Palace, built for Marie de' Medici in 1612, which today houses the Senate. The Jardin des plantes was the first botanical garden in Paris, created in 1626 by Louis XIII's doctor Guy de La Brosse for the cultivation of medicinal plants.

Between 1853 and 1870, Emperor Napoleon III and the city's first director of parks and gardens, Jean-Charles Adolphe Alphand, created the Bois de Boulogne, Bois de Vincennes, Parc Montsouris and Parc des Buttes-Chaumont, located at the four points of the compass around the city, as well as many smaller parks, squares and gardens in the Paris's quarters. Since 1977, the city has created 166 new parks, most notably the Parc de la Villette (1987), Parc André Citroën (1992), Parc de Bercy (1997) and Parc Clichy-Batignolles (2007). One of the newest parks, the Promenade des Berges de la Seine (2013), built on a former highway on the left bank of the Seine between the Pont de l'Alma and the Musée d'Orsay, has floating gardens and gives a view of the city's landmarks.

Weekly Parkruns take place in the Bois de Boulogne and the Parc Montsouris

Cemeteries

During the Roman era, the city's main cemetery was located to the outskirts of the left bank settlement, but this changed with the rise of Catholic Christianity, where most every inner-city church had adjoining burial grounds for use by their parishes. With Paris's growth many of these, particularly the city's largest cemetery, the Holy Innocents' Cemetery, were filled to overflowing, creating quite unsanitary conditions for the capital. When inner-city burials were condemned from 1786, the contents of all Paris's parish cemeteries were transferred to a renovated section of Paris's stone mines outside the "Porte d'Enfer" city gate, today place Denfert-Rochereau in the 14th arrondissement. The process of moving bones from the Cimetière des Innocents to the catacombs took place between 1786 and 1814; part of the network of tunnels and remains can be visited today on the official tour of the catacombs.

After a tentative creation of several smaller suburban cemeteries, the Prefect Nicholas Frochot under Napoleon Bonaparte provided a more definitive solution in the creation of three massive Parisian cemeteries outside the city limits. Open from 1804, these were the cemeteries of Père Lachaise, Montmartre, Montparnasse, and later Passy; these cemeteries became inner-city once again when Paris annexed all neighbouring communes to the inside of its much larger ring of suburban fortifications in 1860. New suburban cemeteries were created in the early 20th century: The largest of these are the Cimetière parisien de Saint-Ouen, the Cimetière parisien de Pantin (also known as Cimetière parisien de Pantin-Bobigny), the Cimetière parisien d'Ivry, and the Cimetière parisien de Bagneux. Some of the most famous people in the world are buried in Parisian cemeteries, such as Oscar Wilde, Frédéric Chopin, Jim Morrison, Édith Piaf and Serge Gainsbourg among others.

Healthcare

Health care and emergency medical service in the City of Paris and its suburbs are provided by the Assistance publique – Hôpitaux de Paris (AP-HP), a public hospital system that employs more than 90,000 people (including practitioners, support personnel, and administrators) in 44 hospitals. It is the largest hospital system in Europe. It provides health care, teaching, research, prevention, education and emergency medical service in 52 branches of medicine. The hospitals receive more than 5.8 million annual patient visits.

One of the most notable hospitals is the Hôtel-Dieu, founded in 651, the oldest hospital in the city and the oldest worldwide still operating, although the current building is the product of a reconstruction of 1877. Other hospitals include Pitié-Salpêtrière Hospital (one of the largest in Europe), Hôpital Cochin, Bichat–Claude Bernard Hospital, Hôpital Européen Georges-Pompidou, Bicêtre Hospital, Beaujon Hospital, the Curie Institute, Lariboisière Hospital, Necker–Enfants Malades Hospital, Hôpital Saint-Louis, Hôpital de la Charité and the American Hospital of Paris.

Media

Paris and its close suburbs are home to numerous newspapers, magazines and publications including Le Monde, Le Figaro, Libération, Le Nouvel Observateur, Le Canard enchaîné, La Croix, Le Parisien (in Saint-Ouen), Les Échos, Paris Match (Neuilly-sur-Seine), Réseaux & Télécoms, Reuters France, l'Équipe (Boulogne-Billancourt) and L'Officiel des Spectacles. France's two most prestigious newspapers, Le Monde and Le Figaro, are the centrepieces of the Parisian publishing industry. Agence France-Presse is France's oldest, and one of the world's oldest, continually operating news agencies. AFP, as it is colloquially abbreviated, maintains its headquarters in Paris, as it has since 1835. France 24 is a television news channel owned and operated by the French government, and is based in Paris. Another news agency is France Diplomatie, owned and operated by the Ministry of Foreign and European Affairs, and pertains solely to diplomatic news and occurrences.

The most-viewed network in France, TF1, is in nearby Boulogne-Billancourt. France 2, France 3, Canal+, France 5, M6 (Neuilly-sur-Seine), Arte, D8, W9, NT1, NRJ 12, La Chaîne parlementaire, France 4, BFM TV, and Gulli are other stations located in and around the capital. Radio France, France's public radio broadcaster, and its various channels, is headquartered in Paris's 16th arrondissement. Radio France Internationale, another public broadcaster is also based in the city. Paris also holds the headquarters of the La Poste, France's national postal carrier.

Notable people

In lieu of such an article, the following may be helpful:
Category:People from Paris
Category:Lists of French people
List of honorary citizens of Paris
List of French people

International relations

Twin towns – sister cities

Since 9 April 1956, Paris is exclusively and reciprocally twinned only with:
 Rome, 1956
 Seule Paris est digne de Rome; seule Rome est digne de Paris. 
 Solo Parigi è degna di Roma; solo Roma è degna di Parigi. 
 "Only Paris is worthy of Rome; only Rome is worthy of Paris."

Other relationships
Paris has agreements of friendship and co-operation with:

 Algiers, 2003
 Amman, 1987
 Amsterdam, 2013
 Athens, 2000
 Beijing, 1997
 Beirut, 1992
 Berlin, 1987
 Brazzaville, 2015
 Buenos Aires, 1999
 Cairo, 1985
 Casablanca, 2004
 Chicago, 1996
 Copenhagen, 2005
 Dakar, 2011
 Doha, 2010
 Geneva, 2002
 Istanbul, 2009
 Jakarta, 1995
 Jericho, 2009
 Kinshasa, 2014
 Kyoto, 1958
 Lisbon, 1998
 London, 2001
 Madrid, 2000
 Mexico City, 1999
 Montevideo, 2013
 Montreal, 2006
 Moscow, 1992
 Phnom Penh, 2007
 Porto Alegre, 2001
 Prague, 1997
 Quebec City, 1996
 Rabat, 2004
 Ramallah, 2011
 Rio de Janeiro, 2009
 Riyadh, 1997
 Saint Petersburg, 1997
 Sanaa, 1987
 San Francisco, 1996
 Santiago, 1997
 São Paulo, 2004
 Seoul, 1991
 Sofia, 1998
 Sydney, 1998
 Tbilisi, 1997
 Tel Aviv, 2010
 Tokyo, 1982
 Tunis, 2004
 Warsaw, 1999
 Washington, D.C., 2000
 Yerevan, 1998

See also

Art Nouveau in Paris
Art Deco in Paris
C40 Cities Climate Leadership Group
International Exposition of Modern Industrial and Decorative Arts held in Paris in 1925
Megacity
Outline of France
Outline of Paris
Paris syndrome

Notes

References

Citations

Sources

Further reading

External links

 

 
3rd-century BC establishments
Capitals in Europe
Catholic pilgrimage sites
Cities in France
Cities in Île-de-France
Companions of the Liberation
Departments of Île-de-France
European culture
French culture
Populated places established in the 3rd century BC
Prefectures in France
Gallia Lugdunensis